Inkosaari (Once Again) is a 2010 Indian Telugu film, directed by Suman Pathuri. Produced by Kalyan Palla, it stars Raja, Manjari Phadnis and Richa Pallod. Pathuri won Best First Film of a Director and Vennela Kishore won Nandi Award for Best Male Comedian.

Plot
It is the story of a group of friends from college, who 7 years after they all separate, meet up for a few days, away from their families and responsibilities and re-live the college days.
They all decide to do one thing they had wanted to do during the college days, but simply could not. Here is their second chance - Inkosaari!
Ajay (Raja), Shruti (Manjari), Bala (Kishore), Deepa (Richa), Sudhakar (Ravi Verma) and Vicky (Sandip) are like any other gang in college. When they are at the brink of graduating from college, Vicky proposes an idea and they all decide to meet at least once every year for the rest of their lives. However, with time all of them get entangled in their own world until Ajay lands in India from US one fine day. He convinces all his friends for a reunion / 7 Day vacation to relive their college days. What happened in these seven days? Along with time, did they change too? What happens when some unresolved issues once again surface? That forms the rest of the story.

Cast
 Raja as Ajay
 Manjari Phadnis as Shruthi
 Richa Pallod as Deepa
 Saandip
 Ravi Varma
 Vennela Kishore as Bala Bokkala
 Harish
 Rao Ramesh
Karuna Bhushan
Natasha Valluri as Divya

References

2010s Telugu-language films
2010 films
2010s buddy films
Indian buddy drama films
Films set in the 2000s
2010 drama films